Wuhu North railway station is a railway station in Jiujiang District, Wuhu, Anhui, China. The station has two side platforms and two through tracks. It is situated north of the Yangtze. 

The station opened with the Hefei-Huzhou section of the Shangqiu–Hangzhou high-speed railway on 28 June 2020.

References 

Railway stations in Anhui
Railway stations in China opened in 2020